Sumter may refer to:

People

Given name 
 Sumter S. Arnim (1904–1990), American dentist
 Sumter de Leon Lowry Jr. (1893–1985), United States Army general

Surname 
 Rowendy Sumter (born 1988), Curaçaoan footballer
 Shavonda E. Sumter (born 1974), American politician
 Thomas Sumter (1734–1832), brigadier general during the American War of Independence
 Thomas De Lage Sumter (1809–1874), American politician

Places 
 Fort Sumter, location of the first shots of the United States Civil War
 Sumter, Georgia
 Sumter, Nebraska
 Sumter, South Carolina
 Sumter National Forest
 Sumter County, Alabama
 Sumter County, Florida
 Sumter County, Georgia
 Sumter County, South Carolina
 Sumter Township, McLeod County, Minnesota

Ships 
 CSS Sumter a Confederate Navy vessel in the American Civil War
 , the former CSS General Sumter, a cottonclad ram captured in 1862
  (previously AP-97), an attack transport; formerly Iberville
 , a tank landing ship
 Sumter-class attack transport

See also 
 Sumpter (disambiguation)